The 1966–67 season of the Moroccan Throne Cup was the 11th edition of the competition.

Fath Union Sport won the cup, beating Renaissance de Settat 2–1 in the final, played at Stade d'honneur in Casablanca. Fath Union Sport won the title for the first time in their history.

Tournament

Round of 16

Quarter-finals

Semi-finals

Final 
The final took place between the two winning semi-finalists, Fath Union Sport and Renaissance de Settat, on 28 May 1967 at the Stade d'honneur in Casablanca.

Notes and references 

1966
1966 in association football
1967 in association football
1966–67 in Moroccan football